Mersham is a mostly agricultural large village and civil parish near Ashford in Kent, England. The population of the civil parish includes the area of Cheesman's Green now known as Finberry.

History
In the mid 19th century, John Marius Wilson's Imperial Gazetteer of England and Wales described Mersham in the following terms:

Until the early 20th century Mersham was for its majority a farming and orchard-tending community with close ties to the local market town of Ashford. The small village dates back to Saxon times and is mentioned in the Domesday Book. The village was owned by the Archbishops of Canterbury for over 500 years. The Anglican church is dedicated to St. John the Baptist and is in the highest category of listed building, at Grade I. It stands on the site of a Saxon church, and is part Norman. It is thought that the village gives rise to the surname Marshman.

The Knatchbulls
The village has been the home of the Knatchbull family since the times of Henry VIII. In 1638 Sir Norton Knatchbull founded Ashford Grammar School, to which pupils were not admitted until they could read the Bible in English, he was also the Member of Parliament for Romney.

In the early 19th century Edward Knatchbull served in the Whig government and in 1830 another Sir Edward Knatchbull became M.P. for Romney and was given responsibility under Sir Robert Peel in his government of 1841.

Geography
Most of the neighbourhood of Cheesemans Green is in the parish.

The clustered village centre is in the small percentage of the parish between High Speed 1 and the M20 motorway.

There are two water mills on the East Stour river, one of which, Swanton, is still working.

Part of Hatch Park, a mixture of medieval deer park and SSSI, is in the civil parish.

See also

 Marshman
 HMS Mersham, a Ham class minesweeper

Notes and references

External links

 VillageNet
 community domain website
 Statistical civil parish overview - map

Villages in Kent
Villages in the Borough of Ashford
Civil parishes in Ashford, Kent